Gianluca Saro (born 25 June 2000) is an Italian professional footballer who plays as a goalkeeper for  club Cremonese.

Career
Saro was born in San Daniele del Friuli. After playing youth football for A.S.D. Ancona and Donatello Calcio Udine, he joined Pro Vercelli's youth set-up in 2015, before joining Juventus' academy a year later. He later played for Cesena and Empoli's youth teams on loan from Juventus, before returning to Pro Vercelli in 2019. He made 51 Serie C appearances over two seasons with the club. In summer 2021, Saro signed for Serie B club Crotone on a contract until 2025. On 30 January 2022, he made his Serie B debut in a 1–1 draw with Parma.

On 12 August 2022, Saro signed with Cremonese.

References

External links

2000 births
Living people
Italian footballers
People from San Daniele del Friuli
Footballers from Friuli Venezia Giulia
Association football goalkeepers
F.C. Pro Vercelli 1892 players
Juventus F.C. players
A.C. Cesena players
Empoli F.C. players
F.C. Crotone players
U.S. Cremonese players
Serie B players
Serie C players